Caryn Richman is an American actress and singer who is best known for her role as Gidget in the TV series, The New Gidget, which evolved out of her lead role in the 1985 television movie Gidget's Summer Reunion.  She played Elena Dekker on the soap opera Texas (1980-1982), Nora Brady, Greg Brady's wife in A Very Brady Christmas and in the TV series, The Bradys.

In the 1970s, Richman was part of Tuxedo Junction, a three-part vocal group who sang 40s music in disco style. Richman starred in a Broadway production of Grease, and used her singing ability on Texas, where she played a successful country singer. Richman performed several songs on Texas.

Richman has made numerous guest appearances on such TV shows as The Eddie Capra Mysteries, Matlock, Jake and the Fatman, Hitman, Angel Fire, and The Adventures of Mr. Clown. She also played the part of Victoria in the film The Black Water Vampire She is also a TV commercial spokesperson for the prescription medication Atelvia, and has appeared as a spokesperson for Papa Murphy's Pizza, and Walmart. In late 2016, she is scheduled to star in a short comedy film with Eddie Deezen and Larry (The Soup Nazi) Thomas.

Filmography

References

External links

1956 births
Living people
People from Jericho, New York
American soap opera actresses
American television actresses
21st-century American women